Sanchai Ratiwatana and Christopher Rungkat were the defending champions but chose not to defend their title.

Darian King and Peter Polansky won the title after defeating André Göransson and Sem Verbeek 6–4, 3–6, [12–10] in the final.

Seeds

Draw

References

External links
 Main draw

Fairfield Challenger - Doubles
Fairfield Challenger